Håheim is a Norwegian surname. Notable people with the surname include:

 Marianne Clementine Håheim (born 1987), Norwegian author
 Stine Renate Håheim (born 1984), Norwegian politician

Norwegian-language surnames